N. S. Memorial Institute of Medical Sciences (NSMIMS) is a co-operative hospital located at Palathara in Kollam, India. It was founded in 2000 in memory of N. Sreedharan (died 1985), a communist organizer who was a member of the secretariat of the Communist Party of India (Marxist). This is the first Co-operative Multi Super Specialty Hospital in South Kerala.
The hospital has 32 specialty departments and 95 doctors including 25 post graduate doctors and more than 950 medical and paramedical staff. It has a full range of services.

History
NSMIMS was established in 2000 in a temporary facility. The hospital started functioning fully from 2006 after being inaugurated by Prakash Karat, General Secretary of Communist Party of India (Marxist).

Location
NSMIMS is situated 6 kilometers from Kollam railway station and 60 kilometers from Trivandrum International Airport alongside Kollam Bypass of National Highway 66.
 Kollam Junction railway station - 6 km
 Kollam KSRTC Bus Station - 7 km
 Kollam Port - 7.5 km
 Kollam Asramam Helipad - 6.5 km

Departments

 Neurology
 Anesthesiology
 Obstetrics and Gynecology
 Cardiology
 Pharmacy
 Ophthalmology
 Plasticand Cosmetic Surgery
 Urology
 Dermatology
 Pulmonology/Critical Care
 Nephrology
 Orthopedics and Traumatology
 Gastroendoscopic Surgery
 Dental and Oral Diseases
 ENT, Head and Neck Surgery
 Reproductive Medicine
 General and Laparoscopic Surgery
 General Medicine and Diabetology
 Pediatrics and Neonatology
 Physical Medicine and Rehabilitation
 Clinical Laboratory
 Radiology
 Casualty and Emergencies
 ART

Nursing college

N.S. Memorial Nursing School has started functioning. The nursing school building opened in 2011 and has facilities to accommodate 200 students. The society has started a B.Sc. Nursing course.

References

External links

Hospital buildings completed in 2006
Hospitals in Kollam
Hospitals established in 2000
2000 establishments in Kerala